Stotfold is a 1907 Arts & Crafts house in Mavelstone Road in the London Borough of Bromley.  It became a Grade II listed building in 1993 for being "of special architectural or historic interest considered to be of national importance and therefore worth protecting".

A "huge baronial style house", it was designed by Thomas Phillips Figgis, for John Roe Hickman of Buck & Hickman. In the 1950s, it was converted into flats.

It is featured in English Heritage's collection of architectural photography.

References

External links 
 Official website

Arts and Crafts architecture in England
Grade II listed buildings in the London Borough of Bromley